Coastal Union is a Tanzanian football club based in Tanga.

They play in the top level of Tanzanian professional football, the Tanzanian Premier League.

Their home games are played at Mkwakwani Stadium. And are officially sponsored by Binslum Tyre, Anjari Q, Masamaki Modern Butchers.

Achievements
Nyerere Cup: 2
 1980, 1988
Tanzania Mainland League Champion
 1988

Performance in CAF competitions
CAF Cup Winners' Cup: 1 appearance
1981 – withdrew in First Round
1989 – First Round

Current squad

Club leaders
Steven Mguto (Chairman)
Hassan R. Muhsin (Assistant Chairman)
James Mwinchande (Member)
Omar Mwambashi (Member)
Salim Perembo (Member)
Hussein Chuse (Member)
Ally Karsandas (Member) 
Abdallah Unenge (Member)

References

External links
 Official Website for Coastal Union
 Club logo

Football clubs in Tanzania
Tanga, Tanzania